Bernadette Olowo, later Olowo-Freers (born c. 1948) is a former Ugandan diplomat.

Olowo is an alumna of Trinity College Nabbingo and served for a time as Uganda's ambassador to Germany. She was named ambassador of Uganda to the Vatican City in 1975, becoming the first woman in over 900 years to be accepted as a diplomat by the Vatican. In the 1990s she began working with UNICEF and UNAIDS on projects to combat AIDS in southern and eastern Africa.

References

1940s births
Living people
Ambassadors of Uganda to Germany
Ambassadors of Uganda to the Holy See
Ugandan women ambassadors
20th-century diplomats
HIV/AIDS activists
Ugandan activists
Ugandan women activists
People educated at Trinity College Nabbingo